Shambhala is a 2012 Thai Drama Romance film directed by Panjapong Kongkanoy. It's the story of estranged brothers and complete opposites, who are thrown together on a spiritual pilgrimage to Tibet. It was released on August 23, 2012. The film stars Sunny Suwanmethanon as Wut and Ananda Everingham as his older brother Tin. The filming of this film was done in Tibet.

Plot
The movie follows brothers Wut (Sunny Suwanmethanon) and Tin (Ananda Everingham) as they set off for Tibet in search of Shambhala, a mythical kingdom in Buddhist tradition, to fulfill the wish of Wut's dying girlfriend, Nam (Nalintip Permpattarasakul). The brothers have a love-hate relationship, but as Wut wants to return to Nam with photographic proof of the trip he begrudgingly accepts Tin's company. As the journey gets more and more intense, the tension grows between the two, especially when a secret involving Tin's ex-girlfriend Jane (Ase Wang) is revealed.

Cast
 Sunny Suwanmethanon as Wut
 Ananda Everingham as Tin
 Nalintip Permpattarasakul as Nam
 Ase Wang as Jane

Awards and nominations

References

External links
 
 Shambhala Movie at sanook!
 Shambhala Movie at K@POOK!
 Shambhala Movie at MThai

2012 films
Thai-language films
Thai romantic drama films
Sahamongkol Film International films
2012 romantic drama films
Films shot in Tibet
Films shot in China